Abu Ishaq Ibrahim ibn Jaʿfar al-Muqtadir better known by his regnal title al-Muttaqi (908 – July 968) was the Abbasid Caliph in Baghdad from 940 to 944. His reign marked the start of the 'later Abbasid period' (940–1258).

Biography
Al-Muttaqi was the son of al-Muqtadir and his concubine named Khalub also known as Zuhra. She was a Greek, and was the mother of Ibrahim (the future Caliph al-Muttaqi). His full name was Ibrahim ibn Jaʿfar al-Muqtadir and his  Abu Ishaq.

Of such little importance the Caliphate had become by now that when the previous Caliph al-Radi died, Bajkam, amir al-umara (Amir of Amirs), contented himself with despatching to Baghdad his secretary, who assembled the chief men to elect a successor. The choice fell on the deceased Caliph's brother al-Muttaqi, who assumed the office after it had been some days vacant; and whose first act was to send a banner and dress of honor to Bajkam, a needless confirmation of his rank.

Bajkam, before returning to Wasit, where he now held his court, went out on a hunting party, and met his death at the hands of a band of marauding Kurds. The Capital again became the scene of renewed anarchy. Muhammad ibn Ra'iq, Caliph's amīr al-umarāʾ, persuaded the Caliph to flee with him to Mosul.

Al-Muttaqi was welcomed there by the Hamdanid dynasty, who organized a campaign to restore him to the capital. However, their ends were purely selfish; they assassinated Ibn Ra'iq, and having added his Syrian government to their own, turned their ambition towards Baghdad. The Hamdanid chief, with the title of Nasir al-Dawla, advanced on Baghdad with the Caliph.

But, however powerful the Hamdanid chiefs were at home amongst their Arab brethren, and splendid their victories over the Greeks, they found it a different thing to rule at Baghdad, due to foreign mercenaries and the well-organised Turkish forces in the city.

And so in less than a year, the Hamdanid chieftains had to return to Mosul; for a Turkish general called Tuzun entered Baghdad in triumph, and was saluted as amir al-umara. However, fresh proceedings against his enemy obliged Tuzun to quit the capital; and during his absence a conspiracy broke out which placed the Caliph in danger, and obliged him again to appeal to the Hamdanid prince for help. Troops sent in response enabled him to escape; he fled to Mosul and after that to Nusaybin.

Shortly after, peace being restored between Tuzun and the Hamdanid chiefs, al-Muttaqi took up his residence at Raqqa — a fugitive in the city which had so often been the proud court of his illustrious ancestors.

Rivalry between officials
With vizier Abu Abdallah al-Baridi gone, on 3 July Kurankij was appointed as amir al-umara by the powerless caliph al-Muttaqi. On the same night, the Turk Takinak was arrested and drowned. Kurankij chose Abu'l-Faraj ibn Abd al-Rahman al-Isfahani as his secretary (katib), and called on Ali ibn Isa ibn al-Jarrah and his brother Abd al-Rahman to become heads of the administration, but without the title of vizier. This arrangement did not last long, however: within a few days, the Banu'l-Jarrah brothers were dismissed, and Abu Ishaq Muhammad ibn Ahmad al-Qarariti appointed vizier. As al-Baridi had gathered new forces and come up from his base in Basra to Wasit, Kurankij sent his own troops under another Daylamite commander, Ispahan, to confront them. On the news of their approach, the Baridis abandoned Wasit and retreated to Basra.

In the meantime, a previous amir al-umara, Muhammad ibn Ra'iq, who had fled to Syria, was strengthened by an influx of Turkic commanders leaving Baghdad, and received a letter from al-Muttaqi inviting his return to the Abbasid capital.  When Kurankij received news of Ibn Ra'iq's march on Baghdad, he recalled Ispahan from Wasit, which almost immediately was captured by the Baridis. On 22 August, he also dismissed the vizier al-Qarariti and replaced him with Abu Ja'far Muhammad ibn Qasim al-Karkhi.

As Ibn Ra'iq approached Baghdad, Kurankij exited the city and made for Ukbara. The two armies fought for several days, but Ibn Ra'iq was unable to secure victory. Nevertheless, on 23 August a detachment of Ibn Ra'iq's army under Ibn Muqatil entered Baghdad, followed two days later by the bulk of Ibn Ra'iq's army, with Kurankij following behind a day later. Kurankij and his men were reportedly contemptuous of their opponent, and Ibn Ra'iq himself is said to have contemplated returning to Syria. But in a fight that broke out in the city itself, some of Ibn Ra'iq's men managed to attack the Daylamites from behind. The Daylamites panicked and were routed, as they were also being attacked by the populace. Kurankij went into hiding, and Ibn Ra'iq's ascendancy was secured. On 22 September, Ibn Ra'iq had the surviving Daylamites executed, and on the next day, he was raised to amir al-umara. Kurankij was discovered and imprisoned in the palace.

Downfall and Succession
Later, al-Muttaqi threw himself into the hands of Tuzun, who swore with the most sacred oaths that he would render true and faithful service. But he soon after deposed him from the Caliphate, and had his sight destroyed.

The same day, Tuzun installed the blinded Caliph's cousin as his successor, with the title of al-Mustakfi, "For whom the Lord suffices".

References

Sources
 
 
This text is adapted from William Muir's public domain, The Caliphate: Its Rise, Decline, and Fall.

908 births
968 deaths
10th-century Abbasid caliphs
10th-century Arabs
Sons of Abbasid caliphs